Kotor Municipality (Montenegrin and Serbian: Opština Kotor / Општина Котор) is one of the municipalities of Montenegro. Its administrative center is Kotor. This municipality is located in the southwest part of Montenegro, and includes 56 recognized settlements as well as the innermost portion of the Bay of Kotor.

Location and tourism
Kotor municipality is located on the Bay of Kotor region on the Adriatic coast, surrounding the town of Kotor in southwestern Montenegro. Kotor is connected to the Adriatic Highway and the rest of the coast and inland Montenegro by Vrmac Tunnel. Inland is reachable by detouring from Adriatic highway at Budva or Sutomore (through Sozina tunnel). There is also a historic road connecting Kotor with Cetinje, which has views of Kotor bay. Since the early 2000s Kotor has seen an increase in tourists, many of them coming by cruise ship. Visitors are attracted by the natural environment of the Gulf of Kotor and by the old town of Kotor. Kotor is part of the World Heritage Site dubbed the Natural and Culturo-Historical Region of Kotor. Municipality is home to numerous sights, such as the Cathedral of Saint Tryphon in the old town (built in 1166), and the ancient walls which stretch for  directly above the city. Sveti Đorđe and Gospa od Škrpijela islets off the coast of Perast are also among the tourism destinations in the vicinity of Kotor. The best known settlements along the Kotor municipality are municipal seat Kotor, Risan, Radanovići, Škaljari, Perast, Dobrota and Prčanj.

Local administration
The municipal parliament consists of 33 deputies elected directly for a five-year term. Following the last local election held on 30 Avgust 2020, the ruling DPS lost its absolute majority, the new local government being formed by a coalition of opposition parties.

Demographics
The 2011 census recorded a total population of 22,601. The inhabitants included Montenegrins, numbering 11,047 (48.88%); Serbs, numbering 6,910 (30.57%); Croats, numbering 1,553 (6.87%); with the rest belonging to other ethnic groups (1,145, 5.07%) or opting undeclared (1,946, 8.61%). By language, 38.46% spoke Montenegrin, while 42.37% spoke Serbian. Major religious affiliations included Eastern Orthodoxy (78.02%) and Roman Catholicism (11.76%).

Gallery

References

 
Municipalities of Montenegro